Raby Moshfegh Hamadani (1912-2009),  was an Iranian Jewish political journalist and writer.

Early life and education
Hamadani was born in Hamadan, Iran, in April 1912. His father Davood Kohan, son of Yitzak, was a Jewish merchant in this ancient city. Raby’s grandfather Yitzak travelled to Jerusalem three times by horse and carriage to visit the sacred city, receiving the title of "Haji Yitzak".

Hamadani attended the Alliance Israelite School in Hamadan, where he became fluent in French. During his childhood and teen-age years, as reported in his published memoirs  he experienced the bitter taste of antisemitism at the hand of his neighbors But the constitutional revolution of 1906 and the overthrow of the Qajar dynasty by Reza Shah in 1925 had infused a new wave of education, progress and modernization throughout the country. Growing up in this atmosphere of hope, Hamadani became convinced that following the path of democracy and political freedom was the only means to achieve equality and prosperity. Iran needed the energetic infusion of the talented and well-educated younger generation to reestablish her place among the great nations of the Middle East.  In 1931, at the age of 17, after graduating from high school, he decided to travel to Tehran to become involved in this new wave of modernization and freedom by leaving his family and traveling to Teheran to continue his education at the University. Since he did not have any means to pay for his tuition, he sold his violin and became a of French language and literature at the prestigious Dar-ol-Fonun دارالفنون high school of Tehran. He was finally able to enroll in the Department of Literature of the University of Tehran, where he graduated in 1939 with a degree in Philosophy and Educational Sciences. His translation of Schopenhauer's difficult philosophical essays was accepted as his thesis.

Career
Hamadani took the first of many steps on the path of journalism and authorship, by publishing his thesis, the translation of Schopenhauer’s controversial philosophy on women and love, with the title “The Philosophy of Love”فلسفه عشق شوپنهاور. His literary work continued in parallel with his employment first as a teacher of French language and literature and later as an employee of the Ministry of Foreign Affairs, where he was appointed as French translator and shortly promoted to Director of the Pars News Agency, overseeing the translation of international news for the Iranian press. He continued contributing to Persian literature by translating world-famous masterpieces by Dostoevsky, Tolstoy, Flaubert, Schopenhauer, Lockhart and John Dewey, among others, exposing Iranian readers to western literature masterpieces unavailable in Persian translation, as well as modern concepts in education and psychology. He was a prolific writer, authoring several works of fiction that first appeared in weekly instalments in renowned magazines of that era, such as Omide Iran أميد أايران, Teherane Mossawar تهران مصور and others. These writings were later published as stand-alone books as listed below and illustrated the frustrations and tribulations of a young and well-educated generation of Iranians confronted by the chaotic socio-political changes caused by the rapid modernization of the Iranian society at the time. His books quickly turned into best sellers and paved the way for his subsequent career as a well-known author, journalist and translator.

During the Second World War, Hamadani was appointed editor in chief of Keyhan كيهإن the highly circulated and most popular daily newspaper distributed nationally throughout Iran. In his editorials, he embraced and supported the political platform of Mohammad Mossadegh and the National Front of Iran. In 1949, after a few years serving in the capacity of Keyhan’s editor-in-chief, he founded the weekly magazine Kavian كأؤيإن (a politically oriented publication with a distinctly secular and nationalistic voice) and became one of Mossadegh's ardent supporters in the latter's plan to nationalize Iran's oil industry (see Abadan Crisis). He had grandiose plans to expand Kavian 's activities to include a printing press and publishing house. He imported a printing press capable of printing the cover pages of Kavian in color, a novel and unique capability that increased the weekly magazine's popularity and circulation. He also founded a publishing company and bookstore,  Bongah Matbouati Safialishah بنكاه مطبوعاتى صفيعليشاه to publish his own as well as other literary works and books. In 1951 he was invited by President Harry Truman, together with a group of Iranian intellectuals, businessmen and influential journalists, to visit the United States in conjunction with the "International Leadership" program implemented by Truman's administration. Hamadani accompanied Dr. Mossadegh during his visit to the United Nations where the latter successfully defended Iran's claims against the Anglo Iranian Oil Company (AIOC, later renamed British Petroleum) and argued for the Iranian government's position in regards to the oil nationalization platform of the National Front. Although the international court at Hague ruled in favor of Iran, President Eisenhower's administration foreign policy was persuaded, by the British government's claims of Mossadegh's collusion with the Communist Party of Iran (Hezb Tudeh حزب توده) and the potential danger of Iran falling into the Soviet sphere of influence, to orchestrate the overthrow of Mossadegh government by a military coup 1953 Iranian coup d'état with the tacit agreement of Mohammad Reza Shah. Hamadani's stance against the monarchy and in support of Mossadegh would cost him dearly: after the CIA-led coup that overthrew Mossadegh, Kavian 's offices and printing presses were looted and burned. Mossadegh, a number of his cabinet ministers and all other journalists and politicians that supported him were arrested. Some were accused of conspiring with the Communist Party of Iran (Hezb Tudeh حزب توده) to overthrow the monarchy and institute a new republican constitution. They were treated as traitors and tried in military courts. Some, like Mossadegh's Minister of Foreign Affairs, Dr. Hossein Fatemi were executed, while others, like Hamadani were imprisoned. Mossadegh was tried and exiled to his native city of Ahmadabad. Hamadani was eventually banished from Iran. He left his family behind, relinquishing his printing and publishing businesses to be managed by his brothers. For the next 50 years, he lived in exile in Rome, Italy, and Los Angeles, California, where he continued his literary activities by translating various masterpieces from French, English, and Italian into Persian. After the Islamic Revolution in Iran in 1979 resulting in the immigration of his extended family to the United States, he also left Italy to join them in Los Angeles, and continued to publish numerous articles, books and translations. A documentary film about his life was produced by the Center for Iranian Jewish Oral History and is available from the Library of Congress. Hamadani died in Los Angeles on 2 October 2009.

Bibliography and Publications
In addition to the hundreds of articles, short stories and sociopolitical editorials published by Hamadani over the course of his fifty-year career in journalism, his collected writings and translations number well over fifty book titles published in Iran and abroad. His most acclaimed novels include Eshgh va Eshgh (عشق و عشق, Love and Love), Delhoreh haye javani (دلهره هاى جوانى, Anxieties of Youth), Tahsil-kardeh ha (تحصيلكردها, The Educated Ones) and Khaterate Neem Gharn Rooznameh Neghari (خاطرات نيم قرن روزنامه نكارى, Memoirs of Half a Century in Journalism).

His translations from English, French and Italian include Tolstoy's Anna Karenina ﺁنا كارنينا and his Selected Letters نامه هاى تولستوى , Flaubert's Madame Bovary مادام بوارى , Dostoevsky's Poor People (ازردكان), The Idiot (ابله) and The Karamazov Brothers (برادران كارامازوف), as well as numerous scientific works in the fields of history, psychology, sociology and philosophy as partially listed here:

Biographies: Stalin استالين (by Emil Ludwig); Napoleon نابلئون (by Louis Madelaine); Nader Shah نادر شاه (by L. Lockhart).

Psychology: Childhood and Adolescence روانشناسي كودك و بالغ (by J.A. Hadfield); Discovering Ourselves روانشناسي براى همه by E.A. Strecher and K.E. Appel; Between Parent and Child روابط والدين با فرزندان by Haiim Ginott, Love Against Hate  اعجاز روانكاوى by Karl and Jeanetta Menninger; Teaching the Slow Learner كودكان ديرﺁموز by W.B. Featherstone; Personal Magnetism مانيتيسم شخصى by Paul C. Jagot;
Secrets of Mind Power حافظه در روانشناسي by Harry Lorayne.

Sociology:
Human Nature and Conduct  اخلاق و شخصيت; School and the Student مدرسه و شاكرد and School and Society مدرسه و اجتماع by John Dewey;
Sociology جامعه شناسي by Samuel King;
What is Sociology? جامعه شناسي جيست by Alex Inkeles.

Philosophy:
Schiller's masterworks شاهكارهاي شيللر;
Schopenhauer's selected works افكار شوبنهاور

References

1914 births
2009 deaths
Jewish writers
Iranian journalists
20th-century journalists